Jeremy Hayes may refer to:

Jeremy Hayes (radio editor), BBC News editor
Jerry Hayes (born 1953), British Conservative politician, MP 1983–1997